Events in the year 1919 in Brazil.

Incumbents

Federal government 
 President: Delfim Moreira (acting; until 28 July); Epitácio Pessoa (from 18 July)
 Vice President: Delfim Moreira

Governors 
 Alagoas: José Fernandes de Barros Lima 
 Amazonas: Pedro de Alcântara Bacelar
 Bahia: Antônio Ferrão Muniz de Aragão
 Ceará: João Tomé de Sabóia e Silva
 Goiás:
 until April 24: Joaquim Rufino Ramos Jubé
 from April 24: João Alves de Castro
 Maranhão: Urbano Santos
 Mato Grosso: Francisco de Aquino Correia
 Minas Gerais: Artur Bernardes
 Pará: Lauro Sodré
 Paraíba: Francisco Camilo de Holanda
 Paraná: Afonso Camargo
 Pernambuco:
 until 18 December: Manuel Antônio Pereira Borba
 18 December - 24 December: José Henrique Carneiro da Cunha
 from 24 December: José Rufino Bezerra Cavalcanti
 Piauí: Eurípedes Clementino de Aguiar
 Rio Grande do Norte: Joaquim Ferreira Chaves
 Rio Grande do Sul: Antônio Augusto Borges de Medeiros
 Santa Catarina:
 São Paulo: 
 Sergipe:

Vice governors 
 Rio Grande do Norte:
 São Paulo:

Events 
13 April - In the presidential election brought about by the death of Rodrigues Alves, Epitácio Pessoa of the Paraíba Republican Party receives 71.0% of the vote.
24 April - Ford Brasil, a subsidiary of the Ford Motor Company, is founded.
11-29 May - The 1919 South American Championship football tournament is held in Rio de Janeiro.  It is won by the home country. 
28 July - Epitácio Pessoa takes office as President, replacing acting President Delfim Moreira, who continues as Vice President.

Births 
13 March - Edgard Cognat, painter and sculptor (died 1994)
10 May - Antônio Olinto, writer and translator (died 2006)
12 June - Rui Moreira Lima, fighter pilot (died 2013)
21 June - Nelson Gonçalves, singer and songwriter (died 1998)
8 July - Helena Salles, swimmer (died 2011)
18 October - Orlando Drummond, actor (died 2021)
11 November - Armando Falcão, politician (died 2010)
31 December - Carmen da Silva, psychoanalyst and feminist journalist (died 1985)

Deaths 
16 January - Francisco de Paula Rodrigues Alves, President-elect of Brazil (born 1848; Spanish flu)

References

See also 
1919 in Brazilian football

 
1910s in Brazil
Years of the 20th century in Brazil
Brazil
Brazil